John Bone (19 December 1930 – January 2002) was an English professional footballer who played as a defender for Sunderland.

References

1930 births
2002 deaths
Footballers from Hartlepool
English footballers
Association football defenders
Hartlepool United F.C. players
Sunderland A.F.C. players
Cambridge City F.C. players
English Football League players